Chung Sum Wai, sometimes transliterated as Chung Sam Wai, is a Punti walled village in Wang Chau, Yuen Long District, Hong Kong.

Administration
Chung Sum Wai is a recognized village under the New Territories Small House Policy. It is one of the 37 villages represented within the Ping Shan Rural Committee. For electoral purposes, Chung Sum Wai is part of the Ping Shan North constituency, which was formerly represented by Young Ka-on until September 2021.

See also
 Walled villages of Hong Kong
 I Shing Temple

References

External links

 Delineation of area of existing village Wang Chau Chung Sam Wai (Ping Shan) for election of resident representative (2019 to 2022)

Walled villages of Hong Kong
Wang Chau (Yuen Long)
Villages in Yuen Long District, Hong Kong